Battle of Ulrichen may refer to two battles that occurred near the village of Ulrichen in the canton of Valais in Switzerland:

First Battle of Ulrichen in 1211
Second Battle of Ulrichen in 1419